Albertina Carlsson (12 June 1848 – 1930), was a Swedish zoologist. She is referred to as the first Swedish woman to have performed scientific studies in zoology.

Carlsson was born to taylor A.P. Carlsson and A.M. Jönsson. She was given private tuition and educated herself at the Högre lärarinneseminariet in Stockholm, 1865–68. She was employed as a teacher at the Paulis elementarläroverk för flickor ('Pauli Elementary For Girls') in 1870–81 and at Södermalms högre läroanstalt för flickor ('Södermalm Educational Institute for Girls') in 1881–1907.

From 1880 onward, Carlsson studied zoology at the Zootomycal institute at the Stockholm University. She produced circa 30 larger and smaller scientific work mainly about the area of comparative anatomy, which was published in Swedish, German and British scientific papers. She particularly focused on the systematic position and relation between different species of mammals. In 1884, she shared the award Flormanska priset of the Royal Swedish Academy of Sciences for her German language work Beiträge zur Kentniss der Anatomie der Schwimmvögel (1884). She was made honorary doctor at Stockholm University in 1927.

References

 Nils Lundström: Svenska kvinnor i offentlig verksamhet (1924), p 70.
 Svensk uppslagsbok, Lund 1930

Further reading
 

1848 births
1930 deaths
Swedish women scientists
Women zoologists
19th-century Swedish educators
19th-century Swedish zoologists
19th-century women scientists
20th-century Swedish zoologists
20th-century women scientists
20th-century Swedish women